Loma is a census-designated place (CDP) in Chouteau County, Montana, United States. The population was 85 at the 2010 census.

History
James Kipp, of the American Fur Company founded the first community here in 1831. The Blackfeet laid siege to the fort, and inhabitants quickly abandoned the site. The next year, the American Fur Company established another trading post, Fort McKenzie, a few miles upstream of the old site. During the 1860s, businessmen built a townsite near the confluence of the Marias and the Missouri rivers, called Ophir. On May 25, 1865, the Blackfeet killed 10 men in the developing town.

Geography and climate
Loma is located in central Chouteau County at the confluence of the Marias and Missouri rivers. U.S. Route 87 passes through the community, leading southwest  to Fort Benton, the Chouteau County seat, and northeast  to Havre.

The Loma area's dry climate supports a natural vegetation of low shrubs and grass. Trees, mostly cottonwood, grow on developed land and in floodplains. Loma is the location of the most extreme recorded temperature change in a 24-hour period in the United States.

Demographics

As of the census of 2000, there were 92 people, 40 households, and 25 families residing in the CDP. The population density was 26.6 people per square mile (10.3/km2). There were 47 housing units at an average density of 13.6 per square mile (5.3/km2). The racial makeup of the CDP was 97.83% White and 2.17% Native American.

There were 40 households, out of which 32.5% had children under the age of 18 living with them, 47.5% were married couples living together, 7.5% had a female householder with no husband present, and 37.5% were non-families. 37.5% of all households were made up of individuals, and 15.0% had someone living alone who was 65 years of age or older. The average household size was 2.30 and the average family size was 3.00.

In the CDP, the population was spread out, with 28.3% under the age of 18, 8.7% from 18 to 24, 27.2% from 25 to 44, 23.9% from 45 to 64, and 12.0% who were 65 years of age or older. The median age was 39 years. For every 100 females, there were 109.1 males. For every 100 females age 18 and over, there were 106.3 males.

The median income for a household in the CDP was $25,208, and the median income for a family was $26,875. Males had a median income of $18,750 versus $11,250 for females. The per capita income for the CDP was $12,885. There were 13.0% of families and 17.1% of the population living below the poverty line, including no under eighteens and 27.8% of those over 64.

See also

 List of census-designated places in Montana

References

External links

Census-designated places in Chouteau County, Montana
Census-designated places in Montana
Montana populated places on the Missouri River